Heinz-Dieter Arzberger (born August 27, 1972 in Wolfsberg) is a retired Austrian football player. He has gained one cap for Austria in a friendly in 2004.  Arzberger played at Red Bull Salzburg for over a decade making him the club's longest-serving player. He won the Austrian Bundesliga three times with Red Bull Salzburg, in 2007, 2009 and 2010.

After the end of his career he became goalkeeper coach of FC Liefering in 2012.

Honours

Red Bull Salzburg
Austrian Bundesliga: 2
2007, 2009

SK Sturm Graz
Austrian Cup: 2
1996, 1997

Austrian Supercup: 1
1997

References

External links
 

Austrian footballers
Austria international footballers
SK Sturm Graz players
FC Red Bull Salzburg players
1972 births
Living people
Association football goalkeepers